Kilbarrack United is an Irish association football club based in Kilbarrack, Dublin. The club plays at White Heart Lane. Kilbarrack compete in the LSL.

The club colours are sky blue shirts, navy shorts and sky blue socks.

The club competed in the 2013 FAI Cup, making it to the last 32.

The clubs all time top scorer is Gary Dempsey who has 378 league goals for the club. Most of them being chips from outside the box.

Honours
FAI Junior Cup
Runners-up: 2011–12, 2012–13: 2
Polikoff Cup
Winners: 2017–18 1
Major Sunday League
Winners: 2017–18 1

References

Kilbarrack
Athletic Union League (Dublin) clubs
Association football clubs in Dublin (city)